Eupsophus contulmoensis is a species of frog in the family Alsodidae.
It is endemic to Chile.
Its natural habitats are temperate forest and intermittent freshwater marshes.
It is threatened by habitat loss and rainforest deforestation.

Eupsophus contulmoensis Ortiz, Ibarra-Vidal & Formas, 1989
Type locality: "Contulmo, Malleco Province, Nahuelbuta Range, alt. 700 m, 15 km W (by road) of Purén, Chile".
Holotype: MZUC 17141.

References

Eupsophus
Amphibians of Chile
Endemic fauna of Chile
Taxonomy articles created by Polbot
Amphibians described in 1989